Ancistrus chagresi is a species of catfish in the family Loricariidae. It is native to Central America, where it occurs near the Panama Canal in the basins of the Chagres River, the Chorrera River, and the Gatún River. The species reaches 19.5 cm (7.7 inches) SL.

References 

chagresi
Fauna of South America
Fish described in 1889